is a Japanese professional footballer who plays as a defensive midfielder for Vissel Kobe. He is also a member of the Japan national team.

Club career

Early career
Yamaguchi began playing football in the third grade, playing mostly as an attacking midfielder. Upon entering junior high, he participated in trials with the Cerezo Osaka, Gamba Osaka and Kyoto Purple Sanga youth academies and ultimately joined the Cerezo Under-15 team, from whom he received an invitation on the spot. He enjoyed steady progress at the club, being selected to be part of the first entering class of the Japan Football Association Elite Program at the end of his first year. In 2006 Yamaguchi was promoted to the Cerezo Under-18 team, which later won the JFA Prince League U-18 in the 2008 season, in which he served as captain and was named league MVP.

Cerezo Osaka
Along with academy teammate Yusuke Maruhashi, Yamaguchi was promoted to the senior team in 2009, spending three months of the season training with the Palmeiras Under-21 academy. He was named to the Japan Under-21 team in his second season and played in all of the matches in a gold medal campaign at the 2010 Asian Games in Guangzhou.

Yamaguchi began to receive substantial playing time with Cerezo in 2011, scoring his first league goal on Matchday 24 against Urawa Reds. The addition of Fábio Simplício resulted in Yamaguchi being increasingly deployed as an attacking midfielder toward the latter part of the season, which he finished with 30 appearances. He followed up by winning a regular position in the Cerezo side in 2012, combining with Takahiro Ogihara in central midfield for both club and country, being named to the Under-23 team.

Hannover 96
On 21 December 2015, Hannover 96 announced that they signed Yamaguchi. Yamaguchi played for Hannover 96 in 2016, however returned to Cerezo Osaka mid-season.

International career
Yamaguchi represent the U-23 national side under Takashi Sekizuka in Japan's successful qualification for the 2012 Summer Olympics. He was included in the final squad at the 2012 Summer Olympics, contributing to a fourth-place finish at the tournament. 

In July 2013, Yamaguchi received his first call up to the senior Japan side by Alberto Zaccheroni for the 2013 EAFF East Asian Cup, where he played in all three matches and was named tournament MVP.

In May 2018, he was named in Japan's preliminary squad for the 2018 FIFA World Cup in Russia.

Career statistics

Club

International

Scores and results list Japan's goal tally first, score column indicates score after each Yamaguchi goal.

Honours
Cerezo Osaka
Emperor's Cup: 2017
J.League Cup: 2017

Vissel Kobe
Emperor's Cup: 2019
Japanese Super Cup: 2020

Japan
EAFF East Asian Cup: 2013

Japan U-23
Asian Games: 2010

Individual
EAFF East Asian Cup Most Valuable Player: 2013
J.League Best XI: 2013, 2017

References

External links

Profile at Cerezo Osaka

Living people
1990 births
Association football people from Mie Prefecture
Association football midfielders
Japanese footballers
Japan international footballers
J1 League players
J2 League players
Bundesliga players
Cerezo Osaka players
Hannover 96 players
Vissel Kobe players
Olympic footballers of Japan
Footballers at the 2010 Asian Games
Asian Games medalists in football
Asian Games gold medalists for Japan
Footballers at the 2012 Summer Olympics
2014 FIFA World Cup players
Expatriate footballers in Germany
Japanese expatriates in Germany
Medalists at the 2010 Asian Games
2018 FIFA World Cup players